The men's pole vault event was part of the track and field athletics programme at the 1920 Summer Olympics. The competition was held on Wednesday, August 18, 1920, and on Friday, August 20, 1920. 16 pole vaulters from seven nations competed. No nation had more than 4 jumpers, suggesting the limit had been reduced from the 12 maximum in force in 1908 and 1912. The event was won by Frank Foss of the United States, the nation's sixth consecutive victory in the men's pole vault. Henry Petersen's silver was Denmark's first medal in the event and the first time a non-American had done better than bronze in the pole vault. Edwin Myers's bronze continued the American streak of winning at least two medals in each pole vault, however.

Background

This was the sixth appearance of the event, which is one of 12 athletics events to have been held at every Summer Olympics. None of the finalists from the pre-war 1908 Games returned. The Americans continued to be dominant coming into the Antwerp Games. Frank Foss had won the United States Olympic trials, making him the favorite; Edwin Myers had come in second.

Belgium, Estonia, and Finland each made their first appearance in the event. The United States made its sixth appearance, the only nation to have competed at every Olympic men's pole vault to that point.

Competition format

The competition continued to use the two-round format introduced in 1912, with results cleared between rounds. Vaulters received three attempts at each height.

In the qualifying round, all vaulters clearing 3.65 metres advanced to the final.

Records

These were the standing world and Olympic records (in metres) prior to the 1920 Summer Olympics.

At first Frank Foss set a new Olympic record with 4.00 metres. Then he set a new world record with 4.09 metres.

Schedule

Results

Qualifying

The qualification was held on August 18, 1920. The qualification height was 3.60. Only three pole vaulters were eliminated.

Final

In the final held on August 20, 1920, only seven athletes were able to clear 3.60 metres again. Foss cleared 4.00 metres and also the new world record of 4.09 metres in his third try. Jump-offs were held to break ties, though details are unclear.

References

Sources
 
 

Pole vault
Pole vault at the Olympics